Rocca di Botte is a comune and town of 860 people in the province of L'Aquila, Abruzzo, central Italy.

History
During the Middle Ages the town was known as Rocca de Bucte, according to documents dating back to the 12th century. In the 17th century Rocca di Botte suffered a serious outbreak of plague, which caused a sharp depopulation. In 1496 the town became a fief of the   Roman family of the Colonna thanks to a donation made by Ferdinand II of Naples.

References

Cities and towns in Abruzzo
Marsica